Ahmad Alimi was the head of the kingdom of Bornu during the late eighteenth century and early nineteenth century. During the later part of his reign, the Fula people within his kingdom followed the call of rebellion and Jihad being led in the west by Uthman Dan Fodio. Ahmad was perplexed by the uprising since Bornu was already an Islamic empire. He started a futile correspondence with Muhammed Bello and Uthman before finally leaving the throne to his son Dunama in 1808. By then he was fragile and blind. He died a few months later.

1808 deaths
Rulers of the Bornu Empire
Year of birth unknown
18th-century monarchs in Africa
19th-century monarchs in Africa